This is a list of members of the Western Australian Legislative Council between 22 May 2009 and 21 May 2013:

 Labor East Metropolitan MLC Jock Ferguson died on 13 February 2010. Linda Savage was elected in a recount on 22 March 2010.
 National Agricultural MLC Max Trenorden was defeated for party preselection in May 2012; fellow National Agricultural MLC Philip Gardiner, initially preselected, withdrew from the Nationals' ticket as a protest. Trenorden announced his candidacy for the next election as an independent in November 2012 and was joined by Gardiner in December.
 National MLCs Mia Davies and Wendy Duncan resigned on 12 February 2013 to contest the Assembly seats of Central Wheatbelt and Kalgoorlie respectively. Martin Aldridge and Dave Grills were elected in recounts on 5 April 2013.

Members of Western Australian parliaments by term
Members of the Western Australian Legislative Council